Potassium hydrosulfide is the inorganic compound with the formula KSH. This colourless salt consists of the cation  and the bisulfide anion . It is the product of the half-neutralization of hydrogen sulfide with potassium hydroxide. The compound is used in the synthesis of some organosulfur compounds.  Aqueous solutions of potassium sulfide consist of a mixture of potassium hydrosulfide and potassium hydroxide.

The structure of the potassium hydrosulfide resembles that for potassium chloride. Their structure is however complicated by the non-spherical symmetry of the  anions, but these tumble rapidly in the solid.

Addition of sulfur gives dipotassium pentasulfide.

Synthesis

References

Potassium compounds
Hydrosulfides